Un drame dans les airs may refer to:
 A Drama in the Air, a 1851 novel by Jules Verne.
 Drama in the Air, a 1904 film directed by Gaston Velle, loosely based on Jules Verne's novel.